Windows Live OneCare (previously Windows OneCare Live, codenamed A1) was a computer security and performance enhancement service developed by Microsoft for Windows. A core technology of OneCare was the multi-platform RAV (Reliable Anti-virus), which Microsoft purchased from GeCAD Software Srl in 2003, but subsequently discontinued. The software was available as an annual paid subscription, which could be used on up to three computers.

On 18 November 2008, Microsoft announced that Windows Live OneCare would be discontinued on 30 June 2009 and will instead be offering users a new free anti-malware suite called Microsoft Security Essentials to be available before then. However, virus definitions and support for OneCare would continue until a subscription expires. In the end-of-life announcement, Microsoft noted that Windows Live OneCare would not be upgraded to work with Windows 7 and would also not work in Windows XP Mode.

History 
Windows Live OneCare entered a beta state in the summer of 2005. The managed beta program was launched before the public beta, and was located on BetaPlace, Microsoft's former beta delivery system. On 31 May 2006, Windows Live OneCare made its official debut in retail stores in the United States.

The beta version of Windows Live OneCare 1.5 was released in early October 2006 by Microsoft. Version 1.5 was released to manufacturing on 3 January 2007 and was made available to the public on 30 January 2007. On 4 July 2007, beta testing started for version 2.0, and the final version was released on 16 November 2007.

Microsoft acquired Komoku on 20 March 2008 and merged its computer security software into Windows Live OneCare.

Windows Live OneCare 2.5 (build 2.5.2900.28) final was released on 3 July 2008. On the same day, Microsoft also released Windows Live OneCare for Server 2.5.

Features 
Windows Live OneCare features integrated anti-virus, personal firewall, and backup utilities, and a tune-up utility with the integrated functionality of Windows Defender for malware protection. A future addition of a registry cleaner was considered but not added because "there are not significant customer advantages to this functionality". Version 2 added features such as multi-PC and home network management, printer sharing support, start-time optimizer, proactive fixes and recommendations, monthly reports, centralized backup, and online photo backup.

Windows Live OneCare is built for ease-of-use and is designed for home users. OneCare also attempts a very minimal interface to lessen user confusion and resource use. It adds an icon to the notification area that tells the user at a glance the status of the system's health by using three alert colors: green (good), yellow (fair), and red (at risk).

Compatibility 
Version 1.5 of OneCare is only compatible with the 32 bit versions of Windows XP and Windows Vista. Version 2 of OneCare supports 64 bit compatibility to Vista. In version 2.5, Microsoft released Windows Live OneCare for Server which supports Windows Server 2008 Standard 64-bit and Windows Small Business Server 2008 Standard and Premium editions. No edition of OneCare operates in safe mode. Windows Live OneCare will not support Windows 7 as its development has been discontinued and replaced by Microsoft Security Essentials.

Activation 
Windows Live OneCare requires users to activate the product if they wish to continue using it after the free trial period (90 days) through a valid Windows Live ID. When the product is activated, the grey message bar at the top of the program disappears. The subscription remains active for 1 year from the date of activation. Windows Live OneCare does not require the operating system to be checked with Windows Genuine Advantage.

Protection 
Windows Live OneCare Protection Plus is the security component in the OneCare suite. It consists of three parts:
 A personal firewall capable of monitoring and blocking both incoming and outgoing traffic (The built-in Windows Firewall in Windows XP only monitors and blocks incoming traffic)
 An anti-virus tool that uses regularly updated anti-virus definition files to protect against malicious software
 An anti-spyware tool that uses the Windows Defender engine as a core to protect against potentially unwanted software (In version 1.0, this required the separate installation of Windows Defender and was not integrated into the OneCare interface, although it could be managed and launched from OneCare. Version 1.5 integrated the Windows Defender engine into OneCare and no longer requires separate installation.)

Windows Live OneCare 1.5 onwards also monitors Internet Explorer 7 and 8 security settings and ensures that the automatic website checking feature of the Phishing Filter is enabled.

Performance 

Windows Live OneCare Performance Plus is the component that performs monthly PC tune-up related tasks, such as:
 Disk cleanup and defragmentation.
 A full virus scan using the anti-virus component in the suite.
 User notification if files are in need of backing up.
 Check for Windows updates by using the Microsoft Update service.

Backup 
Windows Live OneCare Backup and Restore is the component that aids in backing up important files. Files can be backed up to various recordable media, such as external hard disks, CDs, and DVDs. When restoring files, the entirety or a subset of them can also be restored to a networked computer, as long as it's running OneCare as well. The Backup and Restore component supports backup software features such as incremental backups and scheduling.

Criticism 

Windows Live OneCare has been criticized from both users and competing security software companies.

Microsoft's acquisition of GeCAD RAV, a core technology of OneCare, and their subsequent discontinuation of that product, deprived the Linux platform (and others) of one of its leading virus scanning tools for e-mail servers, bringing Microsoft's ultimate intentions into question.

On 26 January 2006, Windows Live OneCare was criticized by Foundstone (a division of the competing McAfee anti-virus) for the integrated firewall having default white lists which allow Java applications and digitally signed software to bypass user warnings, since neither of those applications carry assurances that they will not have security flaws or be written with a malicious intent. Microsoft has since responded to the criticism, justifying their decision in that Java applications are "widely used by third party applications, and is a popular and trusted program among our users", and that "it is highly unusual for malware to be signed."

Windows Live OneCare has also been criticized for the lack of adherence to industry firewall standards concerning intrusion detection. Tests conducted by Agnitum (the developers of Outpost Firewall) have shown OneCare failing to detect trojans and malware which hijack applications already resident on an infected machine.

In February 2007, the first Windows Vista anti-virus product testing by Virus Bulletin magazine (a sister company of Sophos, the developers of Sophos Anti-Virus) found that Windows Live OneCare failed to detect 18.6% of viruses. Fifteen anti-virus products were tested. To pass the Virus Bulletin's VB100 test, an anti-virus product has to detect 100% of the viruses.

AV-Comparatives also released results that placed Windows Live OneCare last in its testing of seventeen anti-virus products. In response, Jimmy Kuo of the Microsoft Security Research and Response (MSRR) team pledged to add "truly important" ("actively being spread") malware as soon as possible, while "[test detection] numbers will get better and better" for other malware "until they are on par with the other majors in this arena." He also expressed confidence in these improvements: "Soon after, [other majors] will need to catch up to us!"

As of April 2008, Windows Live OneCare has passed the VB100 test under Windows Vista SP1 Business Edition. As of August 2008, Windows Live OneCare placed 14th out of 16 anti-virus products in on-demand virus detection rates. On the other hand, as of May 2009, Windows Live OneCare placed 2nd in a proactive/retrospective performance test conducted by AV-Comparatives. AV-Comparatives.org, the test issuer, denotes that it had "very few false alarms, which is a very good achievement." The publisher also points out that false positives can cause as much harm as genuine infections, and furthermore, anti-virus scanners prone to false alarms essentially achieve higher detection scores.

Community Revival 

After Windows Live OneCare was discontinued, end-users of the product could no longer install Windows Live OneCare due to the installer checking Microsoft OneCare's site for updates. This resulted in the installation giving an error message 'Network problems are preventing Windows Live OneCare Installation from continuing at this time'.

A YouTuber by the name 'Michael MJD' posted a review of the software to his second channel 'mjdextras' after finding it at a thrift-store but was unable to get the software installed due to the above error; MJD Community member 'Cobs Server Closet' requested a copy of the installation media to fix this issue.
As of October 20th 2020, 'Cobs Server Closet' posted to their website that they'd successfully recreated a functioning version of the installer, allowing end-users owning existing installation media to reinstall the software. This project was named 'OneCare Rewritten'.

While the OneCare Rewritten software did allow successful installation of OneCare, many of the notable features such as OneCare Circles and built-in Backup feature remain non-functional as a result of being dependant on Microsoft Windows Live OneCare servers.

See also 

 Windows Defender
 Windows Live
 Comparison of antivirus software

References

External links 
 

OneCare
Antivirus software
Firewall software
Backup software
Spyware removal
2006 software